Off-the-grid is a system and lifestyle designed to help people function without the support of remote infrastructure, such as an electrical grid.

Off the grid may also refer to:

Film and television
 Off the Grid with Les Stroud, a 2006 documentary featuring Les Stroud building an off-the-grid home
 Warren Miller's Off the Grid, a 2006 film about winter sports featuring Warren Miller
 "Off the Grid" (Stargate SG-1), an episode of the television series Stargate SG-1
 Off the Grid: Life on the Mesa, a 2007 documentary film
 Off the Grid: Million Dollar Manhunt, a game show on The History Channel
 Off the Grid, a web series starring Jesse Ventura
 House Hunters Off the Grid, a TV series spin-off of House Hunters
 "Off the Grid" (Chicago Fire), a crossover episode of the television series Chicago Fire
Off the Grid, a 2016- 2019 Youtube series created by Moonshine Animations and published by Stikbot Central

Music
 Off the Grid (Bliss n Eso album), 2017
 Off the Grid (The Fooo album), 2014
 "Off the Grid", the first single from the Beastie Boys album The Mix-Up
 "Off the Grid", a song by Kanye West from the album Donda

Other uses
 Off the Grid (food organization), a mobile food festival in California, US